Cameraria quercivorella is a moth of the family Gracillariidae. It is known from Ontario, Quebec, and Nova Scotia in Canada and Kentucky, Florida, Georgia, Maine, Maryland, Michigan, New York, Texas, Vermont and Illinois in the United States.

The wingspan is 6.5–7 mm.

The larvae feed on Quercus obtusiloba, Quercus rubra and Quercus stellata. They mine the leaves of their host plant. The mine has the form of a blotch mine on the upperside of the leaf.

References

External links
mothphotographersgroup
Bug Guide

Cameraria (moth)
Moths described in 1879
Taxa named by Vactor Tousey Chambers
Leaf miners
Lepidoptera of the United States
Lepidoptera of Canada
Moths of North America